The 2008–09 Skeleton World Cup is a multi-race tournament over a season for skeleton. The season started on November 28, 2008, in Winterberg and ended on February 12, 2009, in Park City, Utah. The World Cup is organised by the FIBT who also run world cups and championships in bobsleigh.

Calendar

Results

Men

Women

Standings

Men's

Women's

References

External links
FIBT

Skeleton World Cup
Skeleton World Cup, 2008-09
Skeleton World Cup, 2008-09